Manchester by the Sea may refer to:
Manchester-by-the-Sea, Massachusetts, a town on Cape Ann, in Essex County, Massachusetts
Manchester by the Sea (film),  a 2016 American drama film